Lynn LeMay (born in Tacoma, Washington) is an American pornographic actress. She was also a featured dancer in the U.S. and Europe. In fall 2006, she founded the adult production company LeMayzing Pictures.

Awards
1989 XRCO Award Best Female/Female Sex Scene for movie The Kink with Porsche Lynn
2006 AVN Hall of Fame inductee
2011 XRCO Hall of Fame inductee

References

External links

 
 
 

1961 births
American pornographic film actresses
American women in business
Women pornographic film directors
Living people
Actresses from Tacoma, Washington
Pornographic film actors from Washington (state)
21st-century American women